Silapathai Jockygym is a Thai former Muay Thai fighter.

Biography and career
Adul Khunnoi was born in Udon Thani province in 1974. His father owned a small local camp and introduced him to Muay Thai at the age of 10. He had around 20 fights for the Sit.Poonsak camp in the Khon Kaen and Udon Thani provinces. At 12 he joined the Jocky gym in Bangkok where he began being taught by legendary trainer Pipa and received his ring name. He started competing in the outskirts of bangkok at Samrong and Rangsit stadiums until he reached 100 lbs then made his debut at Rajadamnern Stadium. 
Silapathai won his first major title when he captured the 108 lbs Rajadamnern Stadium belt in 1991, he had 10 wins that year and received the "Fighter of the Year" award from the Rajadamnern Stadium officials he also scored the knockout of the year.

Silapathai beat some of the best fighters of the Muay Thai golden era such as Lakhin Wassandasit, Veeraphol Sahaprom, Karuhat Sor.Supawan, Kaensak Sor.Ploenjit, Boonlai Sor.Thanikul or Chamuekpet Hapalang from who took the Rajadamnern Stadium 122 lbs title in 1994. At his peak his best purses reached 200,000 baht.

Silapathaio shortly retired at the end of the 1990s and attempted a comeback in the early 2000s this time fighting from the Nor.Siripeung gym. Silapathai retired on a win in 2003 when he defeated Phet-Ek Sor.Suwanpakdee by knockout.

After retirement he became a trainer, at first at the Sor.Sirilak camp in Udon Thani province and today at his old camp Jocky Gym which became Skarbowsky Gym.

Titles and honours
Rajadamnern Stadium
 1991 Rajadamnern Stadium 108 lbs Champion(defended once)
 1991 Rajadamnern Stadium Fighter of the Year
 1991 Rajadamnern Stadium Technique of the Year (vs Komsan Saknarin)
 1994 Rajadamnern Stadium 122 lbs Champion (defended once)

Fight record

|- style="background:#cfc;"
| 2003- || Win||align=left| Phet-Ek Sor.Suwanpakdee ||  ||  Bangkok, Thailand  || KO || 2 ||

|- style="background:#cfc;"
| ? || Win ||align=left| Theppitak Sor.Jintana ||   ||  Sisaket Province, Thailand  || Decision ||5  ||3:00

|- style="background:#cfc;"
| ? || Win ||align=left| Dentoranee Dawee ||   ||  Bangkok, Thailand  || Decision ||5  ||3:00

|- style="background:#cfc;"
| 2000-09-22 || Win ||align=left| Phetarun Sor.Suwanpakdee || Lumpinee Stadium  ||  Bangkok, Thailand  || Decision ||5  ||3:00

|- style="background:#cfc;"
| 2000- || Win||align=left| Phetnamek Sor.Siriwat || Rajadamnern Stadium ||  Bangkok, Thailand  || Decision || 5 || 3:00

|- style="background:#cfc;"
| 2000-08-24 || Win||align=left| Chanasak Wanchalerm || Omnoi Stadium - Isuzu Cup ||  Bangkok, Thailand  || Decision || 5 || 3:00

|- style="background:#fbb;"
| 1999-02-30 || Loss||align=left| Thewaritnoi S.K.V Gym || Omnoi Stadium  ||  Bangkok, Thailand  || Decision || 5 || 3:00

|- style="background:#c5d2ea;"
| 1997-07-22 || Draw ||align=left| Ekayuth Kitayongyut || Lumpinee Stadium  ||  Bangkok, Thailand  || Decision || 5 || 3:00

|- style="background:#fbb;"
| 1996-10-16 || Loss ||align=left| Saengmorakot Sor.Ploenchit || Rajadamnern Stadium  ||  Bangkok, Thailand  || KO || 4 ||

|- style="background:#fbb;"
| 1996-07-24 || Loss ||align=left| Paidaeng Lersakgym || Rajadamnern Stadium  ||  Bangkok, Thailand  || Decision || 5 || 3:00

|- style="background:#fbb;"
| 1996-03-20 || Loss ||align=left| Chutin Por.Tawatchai || Rajadamnern Stadium  ||  Bangkok, Thailand  || Decision || 5 || 3:00

|- style="background:#cfc;"
| 1995-12-20 ||Win ||align=left| Chaidet Kiatchansing || Rajadamnern Stadium 50th Anniversary  ||  Bangkok, Thailand  || Decision || 5 || 3:00

|- style="background:#cfc;"
| 1995-10-27 ||Win ||align=left| Prapsuek Sitsanthat || Rajadamnern Stadium  ||  Bangkok, Thailand  || Decision || 5 || 3:00

|- style="background:#fbb;"
| 1995-09-20 || Loss ||align=left| Karuhat Sor.Supawan  || Rajadamnern Stadium ||  Bangkok, Thailand  || Decision || 5 || 3:00

|- style="background:#cfc;"
| 1995-07-26 ||Win ||align=left| Prapsuek Sitsanthat || Rajadamnern Stadium  ||  Bangkok, Thailand  || Decision || 5 || 3:00

|-  style="background:#cfc;"
| 1995-05-17|| Win ||align=left| Komkiat Sor.Thanikul || Rajadamnern Stadium || Bangkok, Thailand || Decision || 5 || 3:00
|-
! style=background:white colspan=9 |

|- style="background:#fbb;"
| 1995-01-18 || Loss ||align=left| Saengmorakot Sor.Ploenchit || Rajadamnern Stadium  ||  Bangkok, Thailand  || KO (Left Cross) || 1 ||

|- style="background:#cfc;"
| 1994-12-09 || Win||align=left| Samkor Chor.Rathchatasupak || Lumpinee Stadium ||  Bangkok, Thailand  || Decision || 5 || 3:00

|- style="background:#cfc;"
| 1994-10-28 || Win||align=left| Kaensak Sor.Ploenjit || Lumpinee Stadium ||  Bangkok, Thailand  || Decision || 5 || 3:00

|-  style="background:#cfc;"
| 1994-09-28|| Win||align=left| Boonlai Sor.Thanikul || Rajadamnern Stadium || Bangkok, Thailand || KO (High kick & Punches)|| 2 ||

|-  style="background:#fbb;"
| 1994-08-29|| Loss||align=left| Cherngnoen Sitputapim || Rajadamnern Stadium || Bangkok, Thailand || Decision || 5 || 3:00

|-  style="background:#fbb;"
| 1994-07-19|| Loss ||align=left| Meechok Sor.Ploenchit || Lumpinee Stadium || Bangkok, Thailand || Decision || 5 || 3:00

|- style="background:#cfc;"
| 1994-06-06 || Win ||align=left| Karuhat Sor.Supawan || Rajadamnern Stadium ||  Bangkok, Thailand  || Decision || 5 || 3:00

|-  style="background:#cfc;"
| 1994-04-27|| Win ||align=left| Chamuekpet Hapalang || Rajadamnern Stadium || Bangkok, Thailand || Decision || 5 || 3:00
|-
! style=background:white colspan=9 |

|-  style="background:#cfc;"
| 1994-04-04|| Win ||align=left| Jaiphet Sor.Vorapin || Rajadamnern Stadium || Bangkok, Thailand || Decision || 5 || 3:00

|-  style="background:#cfc;"
| 1994-02-28|| Win ||align=left| Ekkachai Sunkilanongkhee || Rajadamnern Stadium || Bangkok, Thailand || Decision || 5 || 3:00

|-  style="background:#cfc;"
| 1994-01-19|| Win ||align=left| Komkiat Sor.Thanikul || Rajadamnern Stadium || Bangkok, Thailand || Decision || 5 || 3:00

|-  style="background:#fbb;"
| 1993-12-03 || Loss ||align=left| Nungubon Sitlerchai|| Lumpinee Stadium || Bangkok, Thailand || Decision || 5 || 3:00

|- style="background:#cfc;"
| 1993-10-27 ||Win ||align=left| Prapsuek Sitsanthat || Rajadamnern Stadium  ||  Bangkok, Thailand  || Decision || 5 || 3:00

|- style="background:#cfc;"
| 1993-09-15 ||Win ||align=left| Ekkachai Sunkilanongkhee || Rajadamnern Stadium  ||  Bangkok, Thailand  || Decision || 5 || 3:00

|- style="background:#cfc;"
| 1993-07-28 ||Win ||align=left| Veeraphol Sahaprom || Rajadamnern Stadium  ||  Bangkok, Thailand  || Decision || 5 || 3:00

|- style="background:#fbb;"
| 1993-06-23 || Loss ||align=left| Veeraphol Sahaprom || Rajadamnern Stadium  ||  Bangkok, Thailand  || KO (Left Hook) || 5 || 
|-
! style=background:white colspan=9 |

|-  style="background:#cfc;"
| 1993-05-19 || Win ||align=left| Lakhin Wassandasit || Rajadamnern Stadium || Bangkok, Thailand || Decision  || 5 || 3:00

|-  style="background:#cfc;"
| 1993-03-31 || Win ||align=left| Wichan Sitsuchon || Lumpinee Stadium || Bangkok, Thailand || Decision || 5 || 3:00

|-  style="background:#fbb;"
| 1993-03-09 || Loss ||align=left| Wichan Sitsuchon || Lumpinee Stadium || Bangkok, Thailand || Decision || 5 || 3:00

|-  style="background:#fbb;"
| 1993-02-15 || Loss ||align=left| Singdam Or..Ukrit || Rajadamnern Stadium || Bangkok, Thailand || Decision  || 5 || 3:00

|-  style="background:#cfc;"
| 1993-01-13 || Win ||align=left| Tuktathong Por.Pongsawang || Rajadamnern Stadium || Bangkok, Thailand || Decision  || 5 || 3:00

|-  style="background:#fbb;"
| ? || Loss ||align=left| Muangfahlek Kiatwichian || Rajadamnern Stadium || Bangkok, Thailand || Decision || 5 || 3:00

|-  style="background:#cfc;"
| 1992-09-07|| Win ||align=left| Thapisuj Sor.Maliwan || Rajadamnern Stadium || Bangkok, Thailand || Decision || 5 || 3:00

|-  style="background:#fbb;"
| 1992-07-28 || Loss ||align=left| Saenklai Sit Kru Od || Lumpinee Stadium || Bangkok, Thailand || Decision || 5 || 3:00

|-  style="background:#cfc;"
| 1992-09-07|| Win ||align=left| Samernoi Sor.Boonlert || Rajadamnern Stadium || Bangkok, Thailand || Decision || 5 || 3:00

|-  style="background:#cfc;"
| 1992-03-30|| Win ||align=left| Thongchai Sor.Korakot || Rajadamnern Stadium || Bangkok, Thailand || Decision || 5 || 3:00
|-
! style=background:white colspan=9 |

|-  style="background:#cfc;"
| 1992-02-19|| Win ||align=left| Duangdet Sitdanchai || Rajadamnern Stadium || Bangkok, Thailand || Decision || 5 || 3:00

|-  style="background:#cfc;"
| 1991-12-23|| Win ||align=left| Namkabuan Ratchapeutkafe|| Rajadamnern Stadium || Bangkok, Thailand || Decision || 5 || 3:00
|-
! style=background:white colspan=9 |

|-  style="background:#fbb;"
| 1991-10-21|| Loss ||align=left| Kukkong Por Surasak || Rajadamnern Stadium || Bangkok, Thailand || Decision || 5 || 3:00

|-  style="background:#cfc;"
| 1991-09-30|| Win ||align=left| Komsan Saknarin || Rajadamnern Stadium || Bangkok, Thailand || KO (Spinning back elbow)|| 4 ||

|-  style="background:#c5d2ea;"
| 1991-09-09|| Draw ||align=left| Prapsuek Sitsanthat || Rajadamnern Stadium || Bangkok, Thailand || Decision || 5 || 3:00

|-  style="background:#cfc;"
| 1991-08-22|| Win ||align=left| Mankong Seisomboon || Rajadamnern Stadium || Bangkok, Thailand || Decision || 5 || 3:00

|-  style="background:#cfc;"
| 1991-08-01|| Win ||align=left| Mankong Seisomboon || Rajadamnern Stadium || Bangkok, Thailand || Decision || 5 || 3:00

|-  style="background:#cfc;"
| 1991-02-12|| Win ||align=left| Kwandom Sit Sor.Por.Sor || Rajadamnern Stadium || Bangkok, Thailand || Decision || 5 || 3:00
|-
|-
| colspan=9 | Legend:

References

1968 births
Living people
Silapathai Jockygym
Muay Thai trainers
Silapathai Jockygym